Jordan Sweeney is an American rock multi-instrumentalist, singer-songwriter, and producer. He writes and produces every song on his records, and plays every instrument on them. He has released four albums. He was formerly the drummer for the Southern California punk rock band, Sky Walker.

Discovery and history

Foundation and Sometimes Sky (2007)
Jordan Sweeney, a 2002 graduate of Rio Mesa High School in Oxnard, California, began playing music when he met Richard Galiguis in 2000. Jordan (drums) and Richard (guitar) formed a band called Cant Relate and served as the primary songwriters in many bands such as Greenroom 2001–2002, Saving Sebastian 2003–2004, and Sky Walker 2004–2007. After sharing the stage and playing shows with such bands as Yellowcard, Craig's Brother, Inspection 12 and Rufio, Jordan became sick after he was diagnosed with a chronic illness called Ulcerative Colitis and it became extremely hard to travel, tour and play shows. "When I was diagnosed, I had to research it because I had no idea what it was," said Jordan to his local newspaper. "I asked a lot of people, and they don't know about it. I decided to dedicate my whole musical career (to) raising awareness about this disease." A few months after signing a record contract with a small indie label, Midnight Rekords, Sky Walker called it quits in 2007. Jordan continued to write music but this time used his pain and suffering as his focus. Sweeney decided to dedicate his whole musical career to raising awareness about this disease. He recorded his first album, Sometimes Sky in 2007. Sweeney used YouTube to help spread his message across to people who were suffering around the world, which caught the eye of the Crohn's & Colitis Foundation. Though ulcerative colitis prevents him from touring extensively, Sweeney has played gigs in Nashville, Tenn., Philadelphia, Austin, Texas, and Los Angeles, Cali., with The Crohn's & Colitis Foundation (CCFA) Take Steps program who has supported Sweeney on his tour.

Road To Recovery (2008) and hiatus
Sweeney recorded his second album Road To Recovery (2008) A month after the release of Road to Recovery, Sweeney announced his hiatus from music to spend time with his wife and soon to be born son

Journey To Me (2019) 
Sweeney's third album, Journey to Me (2019) was released nationwide on February 12, 2019 on independent record label, Recovery Records

Disarray (2022) 
Sweeney's fourth album, Disarray (2022) was released nationwide on June 3, 2022 on independent record label, Recovery Records

Collaborations
Sweeney plays the instruments and sings in every album, but in the last two albums he has collaborated with other musicians. Four collaborations featuring Allen Herme on the track "All My Life", Steve Erdody on the track "Silver", Richard Galiguis on track "33 Years", and Yul Vianzon on "Dead Roses", were featured on the album, Journey to Me. On the "Disarray" album, Adam Nigh of the punk rock band, Too Band Eugene and formally of Craig's Brother sings with Sweeney on the track "Insane".  Jesiah Henricksen plays drums on the song "Insane." Cellist, Steve Erdody plays cello in tracks "Deep End" and "The Bird at the Top of the Tree" and Aj Diaz plays guitar in "I Can Do This". .

References

Living people
American male singer-songwriters
American multi-instrumentalists
Record producers from California
Singer-songwriters from California
American rock musicians
Year of birth missing (living people)